The 2005–06 Scottish First Division was won by St Mirren.

As league champions, St Mirren were promoted to the Scottish Premier League.

Allan Jenkins scored the Stranraer winner on a 2 January South West relegation derby leaving Queen of the South firmly in the play off spot that was ninth place. However Jenkins was sold to Gretna 10 days later. Stranraer's league form imploded immediately recording only one other league win from then until the season's end. Queens over hauled Stranraer who subsequently lost in a relegation playoff semi-final to be relegated along with Brechin City to the Scottish Second Division.

Scottish Second Division winners Gretna and playoff winners Partick Thistle were promoted.

League table

Top scorers

Attendances
The average attendances for First Division clubs for season 2005/06 are shown below:

First Division play-offs
The playoff semi-finals took place on 3 May 2006 and 6 May 2006. The final took place on 10 May 2006 and 14 May 2006.

Semi-finals
Stranraer 1–3 Partick Thistle
Partick Thistle 1–2 Stranraer

Morton 0–0 Peterhead
Peterhead 1–0 Morton

Final
Partick Thistle 1–2 Peterhead
Peterhead 1–2 Partick Thistle
(Partick Thistle win 4–2 on penalties, aet)

References

Scottish First Division seasons
1
2
Scot